Euparkerella cochranae is a species of frog in the family Strabomantidae.
It is endemic to Brazil.
Its natural habitat is subtropical or tropical moist lowland forest.
It is threatened by habitat loss.

References

cochranae
Endemic fauna of Brazil
Amphibians of Brazil
Taxonomy articles created by Polbot
Amphibians described in 1988